Kocharli Mosque was an Azerbaijani mosque located in Shusha, Karabakh region of Azerbaijan about 350 km from capital Baku which is currently under control of Armenian forces since the occupation of Shusha on May 8, 1992. The mosque was located on 20 Yanvar street of Kocharli neighborhood of Shusha. Kocharli neighbourhood is one of 9 lower neighbourhoods of Shusha. In total, there are 17 neighbourhoods. Kocharli Mosque was one of the seventeen mosques functioning in Shusha by the end of the 19th century. Mardinli mosque was located in the World Heritage Site of Shusha State Historical and Architectural Reserve.

See also
Yukhari Govhar Agha Mosque
Ashaghi Govhar Agha Mosque
Saatli Mosque
Seyidli Mosque
Khoja Marjanli Mosque
Guyulug Mosque
Taza Mahalla Mosque
Mamayi Mosque

References

External links
Karabakh Monuments

19th-century mosques
Mosques in Shusha